Gaocheng is a town in Yixing, Jiangsu province, China. , it has 3 residential neighborhoods and 14 villages under its administration. 
Neighborhoods
Gaocheng Community
Hongxing Community
Taoyuan Community

Villages
Gaocheng Village
Chengxi Village
Xujing Village
Gaoyao Village
Fu Village
Zhiquan Village
Meijiadu Village
Tianshengwei Village
Fandao Village
Liuwei Village
Hongta Village
Xujiaqiao Village
Songdu Village
Xiaozhangshu Village

See also 
 List of township-level divisions of Jiangsu

References 

Township-level divisions of Jiangsu
Yixing